Omagh District Council  was a local council in Northern Ireland. It merged with Fermanagh District Council in April 2015 under local government reorganisation to become Fermanagh and Omagh District Council.

Its headquarters was in the town of Omagh, which is the traditional county town of Tyrone. Apart from Omagh the area of the former District Council contains smaller towns including Drumquin, Dromore, Trillick, Fintona, Beragh, Carrickmore and Sixmilecross.

The council was established in 1973 and originally had 20 councillors but following a review of local government boundaries in the early 1980s, the number of councillors was increased to 21. Omagh District Council consisted of three electoral areas: Omagh Town, Mid Tyrone and West Tyrone. In the last elections in 2011 members were elected from the following political parties: 10 Sinn Féin, 3 Social Democratic and Labour Party (SDLP), 3 Ulster Unionist Party (UUP), 3 Democratic Unionist Party (DUP) and 2 Independents. The election of Chairman and Vice Chairman of the Council took place annually in June.

2011 election results

2005 election results

In both the Westminster Parliament and the Northern Ireland Assembly, Omagh was completely contained within the West Tyrone constituency.

Review of Public Administration
Under the Review of Public Administration (RPA), the council was due to merge with Fermanagh District Council in 2011 to form a single council for the enlarged area totalling 2829 km2 and a population of 105,479. The next election was due to take place in May 2009, but on 25 April 2008, Shaun Woodward, Secretary of State for Northern Ireland announced that the scheduled 2009 district council elections were to be postponed until the introduction of the eleven new councils in 2011.

Population
The former council area (especially Omagh town) has seen significant growth in the past few years, with the population rising by the most in years. Many housing estates and shopping areas have sprung up in recent times as well.

Population:

1982: 44,417
1992: 46,372
2002: 48,919
2004: 50,082
Population Density – 44 per km2
Home Ownership – 72%
Unemployment – 4.5%
Car Ownership (Households) – 75%
16–74 Population in Work – 56%

The area covered by Omagh District Council had a population of 51,536 residents according to the 2011 Northern Ireland census.

Facilities
The council owned and ran the Strule Arts Centre in Omagh town centre.

See also
Local councils in Northern Ireland

References

External links

Flavour of Tyrone

 
Politics of County Tyrone
Omagh
District councils of Northern Ireland, 1973–2015